Rattowal may refer to:
 Rattowal (India)
 Rattowal (Pakistan)